Sergey Smal (born 30 September 1968) is a Belarusian former wrestler, born in Rechytsa, who competed in the 1992 Summer Olympics and in the 1996 Summer Olympics.

References

External links
 

1968 births
Living people
People from Rechytsa
Belarusian male sport wrestlers
Soviet male sport wrestlers
Olympic wrestlers of Belarus
Olympic wrestlers of the Unified Team
Olympic silver medalists for the Unified Team
Olympic medalists in wrestling
Medalists at the 1992 Summer Olympics
Wrestlers at the 1992 Summer Olympics
Wrestlers at the 1996 Summer Olympics
World Wrestling Championships medalists
Sportspeople from Gomel Region
World Wrestling Champions